My Wife Got Married is a 2008 South Korean romantic drama film. Directed by Jeong Yoon-soo and starring Kim Joo-hyuk and Son Ye-jin in the lead roles, the film is adapted from a bestselling novel of the same name by Park Hyun-wook.

Plot 
Deok-hoon meets In-ah, a former colleague, on the subway; the two turn out to be big soccer fans, and soon begin a passionate relationship. To quell his doubts about In-ah's fidelity, Deok-hoon proposes to her, and they get married. But their honeymoon period doesn't last long, as In-ah declares that she will marry another man.

Cast 
 Kim Joo-hyuk as Noh Deok-hoon
 Son Ye-jin as Joo In-ah
 Joo Sang-wook as Han Jae-kyung
 Kim Byung-choon as Boo-jang
 Chun Sung-hoon as Kim Jin-ho
 Oh Yeon-ah as So-young
 Son Hee-soon as Jae-kyung's mother 
 Hong Hyun-chul as Jae-kyung's father 
 Kwon Sung-min as Sung-min
 Choi Won-hong as Joon-seo
 Jung Se-hyung as doctor Choi Yeon-Woong
 Oh Jung-se as Byung-soo
 Kim Ok-kyung as guardian 1
 Ban Hye-ra as guardian 2
 Hong Won-bae as radio DJ
 Lee Joo-shil as Deok-hoon's mother (cameo)
 Yang Jung-a as Noh Deok-joo (cameo)

Release 
My Wife Got Married was released in South Korea on October 23, 2008. It topped the box office on its opening weekend, selling 515,464 tickets. As of November 9, 2008, the film had sold a total of 1,818,497 admissions nationwide and ranked 10th among the top grossing domestic films of 2008.

Awards and nominations

References

External links 
  
 
 
 

2008 films
2008 romantic comedy films
South Korean romantic comedy films
Films set in Spain
Films based on Korean novels
Films based on romance novels
2000s Korean-language films
CJ Entertainment films
2000s South Korean films